Mynaa is a 2010 Indian Tamil-language romantic drama film directed and written by Prabu Solomon. Jointly distributed by Udhayanidhi Stalin and Kalpathi S. Aghoram, it stars Vidharth, Amala Paul and Thambi Ramaiah. Featuring an acclaimed soundtrack by D. Imman, the film, which garnered much anticipation prior to release, released on 5 November 2010, coinciding with the Diwali festival, receiving critical acclaim and going on to win the Best Film Award at the 58th Filmfare Awards South. Actor Thambi Ramaiah went on to win the National Film Award for Best Supporting Actor in 2011. Mynaa became a major success and ended as a blockbuster among 2010 Deepavali releases and was released along with Dhanush's Uthamaputhiran. This film was remade into Bengali Bangladesh in 2013 as PoraMon starring Symon Sadik and Mahiya Mahi.

Plot
A convict named Suruli recalls his love for Mynaa since childhood that becomes more intense as they grow. When Suruli was 15, he dropped out of school and became an unofficial cleaner in the jeep ferry in his village. He sees 11-year old Mynaa and her widow mother being thrown out of their house due to lack of rent. Suruli becomes attracted to her, as she picks her books first from the mess. He takes the duo to his village and arranges a home for them. He also gets Mynaa into the school where he eloped from, and she keeps studying. Eight years later, Suruli is a hardworking coolie in the neighbouring town and Mynaa is preparing for her +2 exams. She attains puberty, and love blossoms between them, which is despised by Mynaa's mother, who sees Suruli as an unworthy groom. Though Mynaa's mother assures Suruli of getting them married, she changes her mind and arranges for Mynaa to marry a man working in Dubai. Infuriated, Suruli threatens to kill her and throws a stone near her head. He is arrested by the police and given a 15-day prison sentence for murder-threat. Mynaa's mother arranges the marriage on the 14th day (on Diwali) one day before his release.

Here comes the story of sub-jail in-charge DSP Bhaskar (Sethu) and a head constable Ramaiah (Thambi Ramaiah). He married Sudha (Suzane George), the daughter of a very rich landlord. She has four elder brothers who adore her. Ramaiah is a happily married man who loves his wife but is childless. The jail is decorated for the pre-Diwali function, and after the function, Suruli is found to be missing. The jail staff are shocked because if something happens to him outside the jail, or if Bhaskar cannot produce him for court after Diwali, all of them will face severe charges. The district jail-chief gives Bhaskar a day's time to bring him back. Meanwhile, Bhaskar was to immediately take Sudha to Madurai to complete their Diwali shopping with her family as this Diwali was his Thalai Deepavali. To save his job, he secretly quits this tradition and goes to Suruli's village with Ramaiah.

Suruli reaches Mynaa's house by midnight, but her mother locks herself and Mynaa inside and blackmails that if Suruli tries to come in by force, she will immolate Mynaa. Suruli waits patiently outside for the groom's family. Bhaskar and Ramaiah reach the nearest small town to Suruli's village and are forced to move by foot. They reach his village by morning. As the groom comes, Mynaa's mother comes out and blames Suruli for forcing her daughter. Mynaa refuses this, and the marriage is dropped. Myna's mother attempts to kill the duo, but Bhaskar saves them and handcuffs Suruli. Mynaa decides to proceed along with them.

On their way, they encounter more adventures that include an elephant chasing them and losing their way, thereby reaching Kerala. From there, their journey continues, with Bhaskar becoming infuriated with Suruli as he is not able to celebrate his first Diwali, busy running behind Suruli. He promises to give him hell once he is back in prison. A parallel story reveals Sudha and her brothers troubling Bhaskar to come to their hometown for the festival. However, Bhaskar soon develops a soft corner for Suruli as he saves him from a freak bus accident. The four go back together to their hometown. Bhaskar promises to get Suruli released within two days and assures to get them married after Suruli is released. Ramaiah asks Mynaa to stay in his house for shelter.

However, Bhaskar asks Ramaiah to let Mynaa stay in his house so that he can take her safe the next day for the wedding. On reaching his house, Bhaskar finds Sudha waiting furiously, and she also accuses Mynaa of having an illegitimate relationship with Bhaskar, who scolds his wife in anger, following which she leaves the home. On the next day, Bhaskar, Ramaiah, and Suruli on the way to court, find a dead body on the railway track and get shocked, seeing it to be Mynaa. Bhaskar finds out that Sudha's brothers arrived at their house immediately and killed Mynaa, whom they thought to be responsible for the trouble. They then threw her body on a railway track. Upon witnessing this, Suruli gets depresses, where he jumps in front of another train and dies. Bhaskar feels guilty about the incident and gets enraged. He quits his job and goes back to his wife's home, where he kills her and her brothers with a sickle. He voluntarily surrenders and is imprisoned for 20 year-sentence in Suruli's cell.

Cast
 Vidharth as Suruli
 Amala Paul as Mynaa
 Sethu as Bhaskar
 Thambi Ramaiah as Ramaiah
 Suzane George as Sudha Bhaskar
 Sevvalai as Mayi
 Karthik as Mandoadu Manickam
 Vengaiya Balan as Kumbudu Gurusamy
 Hello Kandasamy
 Nagesh Raja(flipkart employee)

Production
After completing the film's script, Prabu Solomon travelled 7,000 kilometers covering 26 towns across Tamil Nadu, Kerala, Andhra Pradesh and Karnataka as he wanted to find a location filled with dense forests and surrounded hills. He finally found it in Kurangani, a town 30 kilometers from the municipality of Bodinayakkanur in Theni district.

Realising that well-known actors would be hesitant to stay in a remote place, Solomon decided to make the film with newcomers. It took Solomon 6 months to finalise the cast and crew. The film was shot in natural light and without any make-up being used for the actors. Due to the remoteness of the shooting location, the crew members had to trek 7 kilometers daily. Despite this, the principal photography was completed in 78 days.

Soundtrack

The film score and soundtrack for Mynaa were composed by D. Imman. The album was released on 27 September 2010, which consists of 5 tracks, featuring lyrics penned by Yugabharathi and Eknaath. The songs, especially the title track, became very popular, while the album was widely considered Imman's finest work yet. The songs "Kaiya Pudi" and "Neeyum Naanum" seems to be similar from the songs "Can I Have This Dance" and "Right Here, Right Now" from High School Musical 3: Senior Year (2008).

Release
The film was later dubbed in Telugu as Prema Khaidi. The film was remade in Kannada in 2011 as Shyloo. A Bangladeshi remake of this movie named PoraMon was released on 14 June 2013. It is being remade in Hindi cinema by Prabhu Solomon, produced by Fox Star Studios.

Awards

References

Bibliography

External links 
 

2010 films
Films featuring a Best Supporting Actor National Film Award-winning performance
Tamil films remade in other languages
2010 romantic drama films
2010s Tamil-language films
Films scored by D. Imman
Indian romantic drama films
Indian drama road movies
2010s drama road movies
Films set in forests
Films set in Kerala
Films shot in Munnar
Fictional portrayals of the Tamil Nadu Police
Indian nonlinear narrative films
Films set in prison
Films about blind people in India
Films directed by Prabhu Solomon